South Central is a neighborhood in Salem, Oregon, United States, located just south of downtown. Major neighborhood features include Bush's Pasture Park, the Asahel Bush House and Museum, Deepwood Estate, Gaiety Hill-Bush's Pasture Park Historic District, South Salem High School, and Mahonia Hall, the official residence of the governor of Oregon.

External links
City of Salem neighborhood profile
Deepwood Estate

Neighborhoods in Salem, Oregon